Larry Randall Wray (born June 19, 1953) is a professor of Economics at Bard College and Senior Scholar at the Levy Economics Institute. Previously, he was a professor at the University of Missouri–Kansas City in Kansas City, Missouri, USA, whose faculty he joined in August 1999, and a professor at the University of Denver, where he served from 1987 to 1999. He has served as a visiting professor at the University of Rome, Italy, the University of Paris, France, and the UNAM, in Mexico City. From 1994 to 1995 he was a Fulbright Scholar at the University of Bologna. From 2015 he is a Visiting professor at the University of Bergamo.

Wray is a past president of the Association for Institutionalist Thought and served on the board of directors of the Association for Evolutionary Economics. He has served, along with fellow post-Keynesian William Mitchell of the Charles Darwin University, Australia,  as co-editor of the International Journal of Environment, Workplace, and Employment.

Education
Wray received a B.A. from the University of the Pacific and an M.A. and Ph.D. from Washington University in St. Louis. He came to Economics relatively late in his academic career after studying psychology as an undergraduate.

Publications
A student of Hyman P. Minsky while at Washington University in St. Louis, Wray has focused on monetary theory and policy, macroeconomics, financial instability, and employment policy. He is a prominent proponent of Modern Monetary Theory in macroeconomics.

Wray has published widely in journals and is the author of Understanding Modern Money: The Key to Full Employment and Price Stability (Elgar, 1998) and Money and Credit in Capitalist Economies (Elgar 1990). He is the editor of Credit and State Theories of Money (Edward Elgar 2004) and the co-editor of Contemporary Post-Keynesian Analysis (Edward Elgar 2005), Money, Financial Instability and Stabilization Policy (Edward Elgar 2006), and Keynes for the twenty-first century: The Continuing Relevance of The General Theory, Palgrave, 2008.

Wray is also the author of numerous scholarly articles in edited books and academic
journals, including the Journal of Economic Issues, the Cambridge Journal of Economics, the Review of Political Economy, the Journal of Post Keynesian Economics, the Economic and Labour Relations Review, the French journal Economie Appliquée, and the Eastern Economic Journal.

See also

Universidad Central, Colombia
Chartalism
Post-Keynesian economics
Heterodox economics
Fiat money vs. commodity money
Government accounting

References

External links

University of Missouri–Kansas City official website
Center for Full Employment and Price Stability official website
Association for Institutional Thought official website
Association for Evolutionary Economics official website
"Ignore the Raters" by L. Randall Wray, The New York Times'', April 18, 2011

1953 births
Living people
21st-century American economists
Modern monetary theory scholars
Post-Keynesian economists
Washington University in St. Louis alumni
University of Missouri–Kansas City faculty
University of the Pacific (United States) alumni
University of Denver faculty